David Robbie may refer to:

David Robbie (Australian footballer) (born 1944), Australian rules footballer
David Robbie (Fijian politician) (1849–1940), businessman and politician in colonial Fiji
David Robbie (Scottish footballer) (1899–1978)